The 1944 Duke Blue Devils football team was an American football team that represented Duke University as a member of the Southern Conference during the 1944 college football season. In its third season under head coach Eddie Cameron, the team compiled a 6–4 record (4–0 against conference opponents), won the conference championship, was ranked No. 11 in the final AP Poll, and defeated Alabama in the 1945 Sugar Bowl on New Year's Day.  The Blue Devils outscored opponents by a total of 230 to 118.

Schedule

References

Duke
Duke Blue Devils football seasons
Southern Conference football champion seasons
Sugar Bowl champion seasons
Duke Blue Devils football